The Paulding County School District is a public school district in Paulding County, Georgia, United States, based in Dallas. It serves the communities of Braswell, Dallas, and Hiram.

Schools
The Paulding County school district is composed of thirty-five schools as of 2012–13: twenty-one elementary schools, nine middle schools, and five high schools.

After the 2011–12 school year, P.B. Ritch Elementary closed and a new middle school with the same name opened near Hiram the following year. In 2017, the school district re-opened the old P.B. Ritch Elementary School facility as the Dianne Wright Innovation Center. The Dianne Wright Innovation Center houses offices for Student Assessment, Professional Learning, School Nutrition, and the Cobb/Paulding Adult Education Center which is operated by the Cobb County School District.

Elementary schools
Abney Elementary School
Allgood Elementary School
Baggett Elementary School
Burnt Hickory Elementary School
Dallas Elementary School
Dugan Elementary School
Hiram Elementary School
Hutchens Elementary School
McGarity Elementary School
Nebo Elementary School
New Georgia Elementary School
Northside Elementary School
Panter Elementary School
Poole Elementary School
Ragsdale Elementary School
Roberts Elementary School
Russom Elementary School
Shelton Elementary School
Union Elementary School
Valley Point Elementary School
Westside Elementary School

Middle schools
Austin Middle School
Dobbins Middle School
East Paulding Middle School
Herschel Jones Middle School
Scoggins Middle School
Moses Middle School
South Paulding Middle School
P.B. Ritch Middle School
Sammy McClure Middle School

High schools
East Paulding High School
Hiram High School
Paulding County High School
South Paulding High School
North Paulding High School

Parent involvement
Every school in Paulding County has a Parent Teacher Association or a Parent Teacher Student Association. These associations allow teachers, students, and parents to hold conferences to discuss the means of ensuring that the student achieves his or her goals.  PTA and PTSA meetings are held either before or after school.

Face Masks 
The Paulding County School District gained national news coverage after images surfaced showing hundreds of students not wearing face masks. The school district had strongly encouraged staff and students to wear a face mask but did not require it. A student at North Paulding High School took the now viral pictures, and was initially suspended. The suspension was later revoked. 3 staff and 6 students later tested positive.

References

External links
Paulding County School District

Education in Paulding County, Georgia
School districts in Georgia (U.S. state)